Schloen is a village and a former municipality  in the Mecklenburgische Seenplatte district, in Mecklenburg-Vorpommern, Germany. Since 1 January 2012, it is part of the municipality Dratow-Schloen.

References

Villages in Mecklenburg-Western Pomerania